Beijing Technology and Business University (BTBU) is a public comprehensive university in Beijing, China. It was founded based on the amalgamation of Beijing Light Industry School (Beijing Institute of Light Industry) (Founded in 1958), Beijing Business School (Founded in 1950), and the Administration School for Ministry of Machinery Industry.

As of 2021, Beijing Technology and Business University ranks in the top 10 nationwide among universities specialized in finance, business, and economics according to the recognized Best Chinese Universities Ranking. BTBU is ranked 63rd in the WURI Global Top 100 Innovative Universities Ranking 2021.

Academics
Under the university, there are 16 schools, 1 department (Research Institute), and 1 education center, within which are 43 undergraduate majors, 35 postgraduate majors, 2 master's degree programs, and some joint doctoral programs that are offered. Among those majors and programs, 16 are awarded the Beijing Municipal and Preferential-construction disciplines or majors. Also at BTBU, there exist 2 national industrial test centers, 1 national experimental center for Practical Teaching, 1 Beijing Municipal Key Lab, and 2 Beijing Municipal Research Bases.

There are three academicians of the Chinese Academy of Engineering in BTBU.

At present, the university has 807 full-time faculty members, 48% of whom have senior professional titles. Eight professors enjoy special research allowance from the State Council; two are awarded as China's Excellent Teachers; three are Famous Teachers of Universities in Beijing; five are Excellent Teachers in Beijing; 53 are Excellent Young Teachers in Beijing; and 11 research teams were selected as Academic Innovation Teams of Beijing.

BTBU now has about 12000 full-time undergraduates, 5700 part-time students, and 1300 postgraduates and doctoral students.

International Cooperation

With the prestige of Beijing Institute of Light Industry, currently BTBU has some prestigious scholars like Prof. Baoguo Sun, and has been actively involved in International cooperation. 

By the agreement signed by the Irish head of government and the Chinese leader (Brian Cowen and Hu Jintao) in 2008, BTBU exchanges lots students and lectures with University College Cork, UCD Dublin, for combined degree programmes (2+2, and 3+1+1/1.5) and non-degree programmes, and recently, with the University of Oxford.

Many students also are recruited by other universities in North America and European, such as Häme University of Applied Sciences.

External links 
 Official Website (English)
 Official Website (Mandarin Chinese)

References

 http://www.ucc.ie/en/mandc/news/newsarchive/2009PressReleases/fullstory,76368, en.html
 http://www.ucc.ie/en/international/ChineseWebsite/ChineseStoriesfromUCC/
 http://aquatt.ucc.ie/en/mandc/news/newsarchive/2007PressReleases/fullstory,46522, en.html
 https://web.archive.org/web/20100609190639/http://alumni.umich.edu/get-active/clubs-and-affiliates/chinese-alumni-relations-program/student-spotlight/liansu-meng

 
Universities and colleges in Beijing
1950 establishments in China
Educational institutions established in 1950